Parajapyx is a genus of diplurans in the family Parajapygidae.

Species
 Parajapyx adisi Pagés, 2000
 Parajapyx alienus Pagés, 1982
 Parajapyx bonetianus Silvestri, 1948
 Parajapyx botosaneanui Pagés, 1975
 Parajapyx calvinianus Silvestri, 1929
 Parajapyx condei Pagés, 1953
 Parajapyx dorianus Silvestri, 1929
 Parajapyx emeryanus Silvestri, 1928
 Parajapyx feaianus Silvestri, 1929
 Parajapyx genavensium Pagés, 1977
 Parajapyx gerlachi Pagés, 1967
 Parajapyx gestrianus Silvestri, 1929
 Parajapyx hauseri Pagés, 1998
 Parajapyx intermedius Silvestri, 1948
 Parajapyx isabellae (Grassi, 1886)
 Parajapyx kocheri Pagés, 1953
 Parajapyx normandi Pagés, 1952
 Parajapyx paucidentis Xie, Yang & Yin, 1990
 Parajapyx pauliani Pagés, 1959
 Parajapyx remyi Pagés, 1953
 Parajapyx strinatii Pagés, 1975
 Parajapyx swani Womersley, 1934
 Parajapyx tristanianus Silvestri, 1929
 Parajapyx unidentatus (Ewing, 1941)

References

Diplura